Joaquín Prada (born 15 July 1991) is a Uruguayan rugby union player who currently plays as a centre for Los Cuervos at the Uruguayan Rugby Championship. He was named in Uruguay's squad for the 2015 Rugby World Cup.

References

1991 births
Living people
Uruguayan rugby union players
Uruguay international rugby union players
Place of birth missing (living people)
Rugby union centres